Marlboro Meadows is an unincorporated community and census-designated place (CDP) in Prince George's County, Maryland, United States. Per the 2020 census, the population was 3,655. It was newly delineated for the 2010 census prior to which the area was part of the Greater Upper Marlboro census-designated place.

Geography

Demographics

2020 census

Note: the US Census treats Hispanic/Latino as an ethnic category. This table excludes Latinos from the racial categories and assigns them to a separate category. Hispanics/Latinos can be of any race.

Education
Prince George's County Public Schools operates public schools serving the census-designated place. The zoned schools are Patuxent Elementary School, Kettering Middle School, and Dr. Henry A Wise, Jr. High School.

References

Census-designated places in Maryland
Census-designated places in Prince George's County, Maryland